Universal Studios Florida (also known as Universal Studios or USF) is a theme park located in Orlando, Florida. Primarily themed to movies, television and other aspects of the entertainment industry, the park opened to the public on June 7, 1990. It is owned and operated by NBCUniversal and features numerous rides, attractions and live shows. Universal Studios Florida was the first component of the larger Universal Orlando Resort to open, ranking eleventh in the world and sixth in North America for attendance among amusement parks in 2019 while hosting approximately 10.9 million visitors.

In addition to the theme park aspect, early design focused on providing guests with a behind-the-scenes look at film and television. A significant portion of the park operated as an active production studio. As producers and filmmakers showed a lack of interest in filming onsite in Orlando, Universal's approach evolved, transitioning to a first-person perspective for its heavily themed rides, areas and attractions. The resort eventually expanded with the introduction of two additional theme parks, Universal's Islands of Adventure, the restaurant and retail epicenter Universal CityWalk, both in 1999, and Volcano Bay in 2017.

History

In 1982, Universal contemplated the idea of opening an amusement park in Florida to compete with Disney. They considered building a larger, more immersive version of their Studio Tour tram ride located in Hollywood, retaining the studio backlot tour theme to set it apart from what Disney was offering at Disney World. However, Universal abandoned the idea after attempts to partner with a skeptical Paramount Pictures failed to materialize. They continued to focus on their Universal Studios location in Los Angeles, planning an upgrade to the Studio Tour with a new, massive scene based on the 1976 film King Kong. It opened in 1986 as King Kong Encounter and became an instant hit with guests, which prompted Universal to revisit the notion of building a Florida theme park.

That same year, former Disney Imagineer Peter Alexander, who worked on the life-size King Kong animatronic and was now an executive at Universal Creative, met with his friend and renowned director Steven Spielberg to discuss the creation of a Back to the Future simulator ride. Star Wars creator George Lucas, who recently helped Disney design the well-received Star Tours attraction at Disneyland, had previously boasted to Spielberg that Universal was incapable of building such a ride. Spielberg and Alexander gladly accepted the challenge and began working on the ride's concept. Universal was already working on the design for its backlot tram tour attraction in Florida, which would include multiple scenes depicted at the Hollywood location.

In 1987, Disney CEO Michael Eisner, previously the CEO at Paramount when Universal pitched their Florida park idea several years earlier, announced intentions to create their own studio backlot tour at Walt Disney World. The new area, to be called Disney-MGM Studios, was a preemptive move to counter Universal's planned introduction into the Orlando market. Although Universal publicly announced their Florida park intentions prior to Eisner's announcement, Disney was in a better position to fast-track construction and open sooner. This forced Universal to rethink their approach and abandon the tram tour concept. Instead, they opted to build standalone attractions while retaining the overall studio backlot theme. Their projected opening day lineup would include Kongfrontation, Jaws, and the Spielberg and Alexander collaborative project, Back to the Future: The Ride. A large theme park with separate attractions was a new concept for Universal, and their creative team ran into multiple obstacles during development and testing. Among the casualties from the early troubles was the Back to the Future ride, which had its opening delayed by nearly a year.

The park was built for an estimated $630 million, with 50% ownership in the hands of MCA Universal and 50% belonging to leisure company The Rank Organisation. While under the ownership of Seagram, MCA Universal would again partner with The Rank Group (corporate successor to The Rank Organisation) a decade later in the $2.5 billion major expansion of Universal Studios Florida. The expansion included the addition of Universal's Islands of Adventure, Universal CityWalk, and several hotels. In 2000, The Rank Group sold its 50% stake to Blackstone Capital Partners for $275 million, who in turn sold it to NBCUniversal for $3.165 billion, giving the company 100% ownership of the resort.

Development
Many of the attractions over the years were developed in close collaboration with directors, producers and actors from the films on which they were based. In many cases, actors reprised their roles, contributing new dialogue and footage to fill pre-show queues and action sequences within the attraction itself. Examples include Rip Torn and Will Smith for Men in Black: Alien Attack, Brendan Fraser and Arnold Vosloo for Revenge of the Mummy, and multiple members of The Simpsons cast for The Simpsons Ride. Steven Spielberg assisted with the development of E.T. Adventure and was a creative consultant for Back to the Future: The Ride, Twister...Ride it Out, An American Tail Theatre, Jaws, Men in Black: Alien Attack and Transformers: The Ride 3D.

Production facilities
Universal Studios Florida was originally designed to function as both a theme park and working production studio. Several movies, television series, commercials, music videos, and other forms of media have been produced onsite throughout its history. Nickelodeon Studios was one of the early pillars behind the working studio concept, and it was featured in various locations throughout the park in the form of soundstages. Popular kids' shows such as Double Dare were produced on location, and guests could tour the facilities for a behind-the-scenes experience. Film production also occurred onsite and various sets could be explored by guests riding the park's Production Studio Tour. Psycho IV: The Beginning was the first film to be produced at the Florida park location while it was open to the public, and visitors during the park's first month of operation were able to get a glimpse of live production. In 1991, John Landis was forced to move from Universal Studios Hollywood to Universal Studios Florida to finish filming the comedy film Oscar, after a disgruntled employee set a fire that destroyed most of the set at the Hollywood location.

For a brief time, Universal Studios Florida featured a backlot tour tram ride attraction, called the Production Studio Tour, with elements that were similar to the version at Universal Studios Hollywood. Guests toured active production set facilities in use for film and television. Disney heavily invested in the same working studio concept but, shortly after Universal Studios Florida opened, filming at the parks and even in the state was becoming less attractive to producers concerned about the logistics, expenses, and limited available resources. Consequently, Universal ended the Production Studio Tour only five years into the park's history in 1995, and Nickelodeon's TV production moved to California in 2005. Smaller shows and commercials continued to be produced, but the backlot studio concept was becoming less of a draw for visitors. Universal gradually moved away from the fourth wall convention in the design of new attractions, with cast and crew directly addressing guests. Instead of witnessing how a film was made, the experience was increasingly being designed to transport guests into the middle of the action. The Wizarding World of Harry Potter, with the completion of Hogsmeade in 2010 and Diagon Alley in 2014, accelerated this transition and reflects the park's modern strategy and approach.

Despite the evolution and growing emphasis being placed on the theme park aspect, some soundstages at Universal Studios Florida remained active. Wheel of Fortune was relocated to the park in 1999 to help promote the upcoming debut of Islands of Adventure. Nickelodeon returned temporarily in 2008 for the shooting of My Family's Got Guts. The 2010–11 season of RTL Group's Family Feud was filmed on site, coinciding with the show's debut of new host Steve Harvey, but the show was relocated in 2011 to Atlanta, Georgia. The revival of Howie Mandel's Deal or No Deal in 2018 was filmed in Soundstage 21 for CNBC. Local and national commercials were also shot at various soundstages.

Branding
Slogans marketed by Universal Studios Florida over the years included: See the Stars. Ride the Movies. (1990–1998); No one makes believe like we do! (1990–1998); Ride the Movies (1998–2008); Jump into the Action (2008–2012); Experience The Movies (2012–2015) and Vacation Like You Mean It (2013–2019). The current slogan for Universal Orlando Resort is "Let Yourself Woah" (2020–present). This current marketing has been applied to all global tourist locations, including the original Universal Studios Hollywood.

Park timeline of events

Areas and attractions

Universal Studios Florida features nine themed areas all situated around a large lagoon.

The nine surrounding themed areas, clockwise from the entrance, are Minion Land on Illumination Ave, Production Central, New York, San Francisco, London/Diagon Alley, World Expo, Springfield USA, Woody Woodpecker's KidZone and Hollywood. Each area features a combination of rides, shows, attractions, character appearances, dining outlets and merchandise stores. The newest area, based on Despicable Me, will be added to the park in Summer 2023.

Minion Land on Illumination Ave

Opening in 2023, this new area will encompass the existing Despicable Me Minion Mayhem attraction and Super Silly Stuff store, and will include the new Minions' Cafe and Villain-Con Minion Blast attraction.

Production Central

The area is also home to a variety of dining outlets and merchandise shops.

New York

The New York section of the park features several dining outlets: Finnegan's Bar and Grill and Louie's Italian Restaurant which were designed for the park as well as Starbucks Coffee and Häagen-Dazs which are commercial franchises. There are also two merchandise shops: Sahara Traders and Rosie's Irish Shop. The first two feature merchandise related to attractions within this area. Also located here is a statue of longtime MCA/Universal executive Lew Wasserman, honoring his achievements and history while head of Universal.

As Nickelodeon was headquartered in the park at the time, the opening credits for Roundhouse and All That (two of its shows) were filmed around this area of the park.

San Francisco

In August 2015, Universal announced that it would replace Disaster! with a new attraction based on the film franchise The Fast and the Furious. The company later revealed that this attraction would use Universal's new "Virtual Line" system, allowing guests to select a time frame in which they want to ride. Fast & Furious: Supercharged opened on April 23, 2018.

The Wizarding World of Harry Potter – Diagon Alley/London

Diagon Alley is the second half of The Wizarding World of Harry Potter.

Opened on July 8, 2014, The Wizarding World of Harry Potter – Diagon Alley/London features two attractions, Harry Potter and the Escape from Gringotts and the Hogwarts Express, which connects the area to The Wizarding World of Harry Potter – Hogsmeade at Islands of Adventure. Diagon Alley also features a restaurant The Leaky Cauldron and several "signature shops". These include, Ollivanders Wand Shop, Weasleys' Wizard Wheezes, Borgin and Burkes, Madam Malkin's Robes for All Occasions, Wiseacre's Wizarding Equipment, and Florean Fortescue's Ice Cream Parlour.

World Expo

Sometime after June 2005 the optical illusion of the Space Shuttle was removed from this part of the park. As you headed towards World Expo from San Francisco it was one of the many designated photo spots throughout the park. There was a hanging platform that you would place your camera on and take the picture. The Shuttle would look as though it was sitting on the top of Back to the Future: The Ride.

Springfield

Springfield used to be classed as a part of the World Expo until 2017.

Woody Woodpecker's KidZone

On January 15, 2023, the majority of Woody Woodpecker's KidZone and its rides Woody Woodpecker's Nuthouse Coaster and Fievel's Waterslide, the play areas Curious George Goes to Town and Fievel's Playland, and the Shrek-themed meet-and-greet style attraction which was opened the year before after the closure of Shrek 4-D, were permanently closed to make room for an unannounced area rumored to be themed to DreamWorks Animation. E.T. Adventure and Animal Actors on Location were kept, as well as SpongeBob StorePants, a SpongeBob SquarePants-themed merchandise store, and KidZone Pizza Company, a seasonal pizzeria located by the area's entrance.

Hollywood

Hollywood's two dining outlets are recreations of actual Hollywood outlets. Schwab's Pharmacy and Mel's Drive-In offer guests a variety of food and beverage options. A third outlet, named Cafe La Bamba, operates seasonally. Guests can purchase magic-related items from Theatre Magic.

Lagoon

Retired attractions

Notable retired attractions include Kongfrontation, Back to the Future: The Ride, The Funtastic World of Hanna-Barbera, its replacement Jimmy Neutron's Nicktoon Blast, Jaws, T2-3D: Battle Across Time, Shrek 4-D, Woody Woodpecker's Nuthouse Coaster, and Fievel's Waterslide. Universal Studios also housed other unique attractions that are now retired, like Nickelodeon Studios and the interactive film and live-action show Alfred Hitchcock: The Art of Making Movies. The current location of Diagon Alley was once a section of the park named Amity Island, based on the fictional seaside town from Jaws, which contained the park's Jaws attraction. The area was completely demolished to make way for the Diagon Alley portion of The Wizarding World of Harry Potter attraction. As a homage to the Jaws attraction and Amity section that was available to so many visitors over the years, references to both are sprinkled throughout Diagon Alley, one being a set of shark jawbones appearing behind the herbs and potions of Mr. Mulpepper's Apothecary. Nickelodeon Studios became a Blue Man Group attraction and live show in 2007. In 2021, the Blue Man Group show would also be retired, leaving the original Nickelodeon Studios building empty for the first time since opening until 2022, when the Grinchmas show was moved into that theater.

Character appearances

Universal Studios Florida has a number of famous characters, including:

Current characters
 Beetlejuice, Frankenstein's Monster, Count Dracula and the Bride of Frankenstein
 Betty Boop
 The Blues Brothers
 Back to the Future: Doc Brown and Marty McFly
 Despicable Me: Gru, Vector, Lucy Wilde, Margo, Edith, Agnes, Dru, and the Minions
 Dora the Explorer: Dora, Boots, and Diego
 E.T.
 Hello Kitty
 Kung Fu Panda: Po and Tigress
 Madagascar: Alex, Gloria, Skipper, Kowalski, Rico, Private, and King Julien XIII
 Men in Black: Agent J and Agent K
 The Mummy: Stilt walkers
 Puss in Boots: Puss and Kitty Softpaws
 Rocky & Bullwinkle: Rocket J. Squirrel and Bullwinkle J. Moose
 Scooby-Doo: Scooby, Shaggy, Daphne, Velma, and Fred
 Shrek: Shrek and Princess Fiona
 The Simpsons: Homer, Marge, Bart,  Lisa, Krusty the Clown, and Sideshow Bob
 SpongeBob SquarePants: SpongeBob, Patrick, Squidward, and Bikini Bottomites
 Transformers: Optimus Prime, Bumblebee, and Megatron
 Trolls: Poppy, Branch, and Guy Diamond

Annual events
Universal Studios Florida features several seasonal events throughout its operating calendar. Some are included in the daily park admission, while others are separately-ticketed events.

Grad Bash and Gradventure
Grad Bash and Gradventure are two separate events held in April and May at the park. Grad Bash is an event for graduating high school senior classes who can gather for an exclusive, all-night party at both theme parks of Universal Orlando Resort, live performances, dance parties, and live pre-parties at the Universal Music Plaza Stage. After Disney's retirement of Grad Nite, Grad Bash was held for five nights in 2012. Gradventure is aimed to junior high/middle school graduating students.

Halloween Horror Nights

Universal's Halloween Horror Nights is a hard-ticketed event where the park becomes into a haunted playground, including scare zones, numerous haunted houses, and special themed shows. The event is run annually in late September, October, and early November.

Universal's Holiday Parade featuring Macy's

Universal's Holiday Parade featuring Macy's, formerly known as Macy's Holiday Parade, is a month-long event in December featuring authentic balloons from the Macy's Thanksgiving Day Parade in celebration of Christmas at the park. The parade was rebranded in 2017, adding holiday floats, balloons, and choreographed characters based on Illumination's Despicable Me franchise, as well as the Madagascar and Shrek franchises from DreamWorks Animation.

Mardi Gras
Generally in February through to April, a parade and concert series inspired by New Orleans' Fat Tuesday party is held at the park. The parade takes place in the evening and consists of park employees and other appointed park guests throwing beads to other park guests.

Rock the Universe

Rock the Universe is the park's Christian music festival, featuring two days in January or February (as of 2019, prior years held this event in September. This was likely done in response to the cancellation of the event in 2017 due to Hurricane Irma.) of concerts with leading contemporary Christian, Christian rock, and Christian rap artists live at the Universal Music Plaza Stage.

Summer Concert Series
The Summer Concert Series occurs annually and features a variety of popular music acts performing live at the Universal Music Plaza Stage.

Universal Express

Universal offers an optional, pay-per-person pass known as Universal Express, which gives guests access to shorter lines at many attractions throughout its theme parks. The cost for Universal Express is in addition to the cost of park admission, and there are limited quantities available each day. Guests with Universal Express are given priority boarding status and enter a separate line queue at attractions that support it. The standard Universal Express pass allows guests to access the Universal Express line once per attraction, while the more expensive Universal Express Unlimited has no such restriction.

Attendance

Closures
The park has had some unscheduled closures. These included:
 September 15, 1999, due to Hurricane Floyd
 September 11, 2001, due to the September 11 attacks
 August 2004, due to Hurricane Charley
 October 7, 2016, due to Hurricane Matthew
 September 10–12, 2017, due to Hurricane Irma
 March 16 – June 4, 2020, due to COVID-19 pandemic
 September 28–29, 2022, due to Hurricane Ian
 November 9–10, 2022, due to Tropical Storm Nicole

See also

 Incidents at Universal parks
 Universal Orlando Resort
 List of Universal Studios Orlando attractions
 List of former Universal Studios Florida attractions
 Universal's Islands of Adventure

References

External links
 
 

 
Amusement parks in Orlando, Florida
Backlot sets
Television studios in the United States
1990 establishments in Florida
Tourist attractions in Greater Orlando
Tourist attractions in Orange County, Florida
Universal Parks & Resorts attractions by name
Amusement parks opened in 1990
Impact Wrestling